Trichocentrum stramineum is a species of orchid endemic to Mexico (Veracruz).

References

External links 

stramineum
Endemic orchids of Mexico
Flora of Veracruz